Diaea ambara is a species of crab spider that is endemic to New Zealand.

Taxonomy 
Diaea ambara was first described in 1885 by Arthur Urquhart as Philodromus ambarus. P. ambarus was later moved to the Diaea genus and redescribed as D. ambara.

Description 
Females are about 6mm in length. Cephalothorax is golden brown, abdomen is tan with faint markings. However, colour is very variable and is assumed to aid camouflage.

Behaviour 
Diaea ambara are ambush predators that typically hunt on the leaves of bushes and trees.

Males search for the female to begin courtship. The male will approach from the side and use his front legs to touch the females front legs and then her body while she retracts her legs and crouches. The male then proceeds to lash the female down with silk and crawls underneath her and commences mating. After mating, the male leaves and the female easily gets free of the silk.

References 

Spiders described in 1885
Spiders of New Zealand
Thomisidae